Rautanen (from Finnish rauta ("iron") + the surname-forming suffix -nen) is a Finnish family name. Notable people with the surname include:
  (born 1986), Finnish sprinter
 Juho Rautanen (born 1997), Finnish ice hockey player
 Martti Rautanen (1845–1926), Finnish Lutheran missionary
 Tuula Rautanen (born 1942), Finnish sprinter

Finnish-language surnames